This page lists all cases of the Judicial Committee of the Privy Council originating in Canada, and decided in the years 1910 to 1919.

From 1867 to 1949, the Judicial Committee of the Privy Council was the highest court of appeal for Canada.  Its decisions on appeals from Canadian courts had binding legal precedent on all Canadian courts, including the Supreme Court of Canada. The Supreme Court was required to follow the cases of the Judicial Committee, and the Judicial Committee could overturn decisions of the Supreme Court. The Judicial Committee decisions were the ultimate judicial authority for the Canadian courts, and had a considerable influence on the development of Canadian law, particularly constitutional law.

Case list

Summary by year and result

Summary by jurisdiction and court appealed from

See also
 List of Canadian appeals to the Judicial Committee of the Privy Council, 1867–1869
 List of Canadian appeals to the Judicial Committee of the Privy Council, 1870–1879
 List of Canadian appeals to the Judicial Committee of the Privy Council, 1880–1889
 List of Canadian appeals to the Judicial Committee of the Privy Council, 1890–1899
 List of Canadian appeals to the Judicial Committee of the Privy Council, 1900–1909
 List of Canadian appeals to the Judicial Committee of the Privy Council, 1920–1929
 List of Canadian appeals to the Judicial Committee of the Privy Council, 1930–1939
 List of Canadian appeals to the Judicial Committee of the Privy Council, 1940–1949
 List of Canadian appeals to the Judicial Committee of the Privy Council, 1950–1959

Sources
 British and Irish Legal Information Institute:  Privy Council Decisions
 1910 Privy Council Decisions
 1911 Privy Council Decisions
 1912 Privy Council Decisions
 1913 Privy Council Decisions
 1914 Privy Council Decisions
 1915 Privy Council Decisions
 1916 Privy Council Decisions
 1917 Privy Council Decisions
 1918 Privy Council Decisions
 1919 Privy Council Decisions

References 

1910s in Canada
Canadian case law lists
Canada